(also be transcribed as ) is one of the six letters the Arabic alphabet added to the twenty-two inherited from the Phoenician alphabet (the others being , , ,). In Modern Standard Arabic it represents . Its numerical value is 700 (see abjad numerals). The Arabic letter  is named  . It is written in several ways depending in its position in the word: 

This sound is found in English, as in the words "those" or "then". In English the sound is normally rendered "dh" when transliterated from foreign languages, but when it occurs in English words it is one of the pronunciations occurring for the letters "th".

Pronunciations 
Between and within contemporary varieties of Arabic, pronunciation of the letter  differs:

 In Maghrebi Arabic, it is consistently pronounced as the voiced dental plosive .
Furthermore it keeps its classical value   in some Classical Arabic words.
 In the Mashriq (in the broad sense, including Egyptian, Sudanese and Levantine dialects), it becomes a sibilant voiced alveolar fricative .

Regardless of these regional differences, the pattern of the speaker's variety of Arabic frequently intrudes into otherwise Modern Standard speech; this is widely accepted, and is the norm when speaking the mesolect known alternately as lugha wusṭā ("middling/compromise language") or ʿAmmiyyat/Dārijat al-Muṯaqqafīn ("Educated/Cultured Colloquial") used in the informal speech of educated Arabs of different countries. (cf. Arabic dialect#Formal and vernacular differences)

See also 
Arabic phonology

Arabic letters